The Gotthard Panorama Express is a tourist oriented boat and panoramic train line which connects Lucerne to Lugano, crossing the Swiss Alps from North to South through the Gotthard crest tunnel. Until 2017, the train was known as the William Tell Express. It is jointly operated by the Swiss Federal Railways, who operate the train, and the Lake Lucerne Navigation Company (SGV), who operate the boat. Previous iterations of the train ran to a southern terminus at Locarno rather than the current terminus at Lugano.

In the southerly direction, the journey starts from the quayside in front of Lucerne station, in the central Swiss city of Lucerne, which sits at the western end of Lake Lucerne. This end of the lake is surrounded by the famous peaks of the Rigi, Pilatus and Bürgenstock, and the route sails between these. The voyage then passes the Rütli meadow, where the Swiss Confederacy first came together, and the Tell Chapel that commemorates William Tell, the folk hero from whom the service took its former name. Finally the boat arrives at the landing stage in Flüelen, at the eastern end of the lake and a three minute walk from Flüelen station.

At Flüelen station, passengers transfer to the train, which takes the scenic original line of the Gotthard railway, climbing up the valley of the Reuss. As part of this climb, the railway makes several spiral loops in order to gain height, giving a series of different views of the village and church of Wassen, which lie in the centre of the loops. At Göschenen station the train enters the original Gotthard Tunnel and emerges into the southern facing Leventina valley in the Italian speaking canton of Ticino. Descending this, with the aid of several more spiral loops, the train eventually arrives at Bellinzona, the capital city of Ticino that is famous for its three World Heritage listed castles. Connections are available at Bellinzona station for Locarno. The train then continues to Lugano station, in the southern Swiss city of Lugano on the lake of the same name. 

The whole journey takes about six hours, divided roughly evenly between the boat and the train, and operates once a day in both directions, on most days between mid-April and mid-October. The section on Lake Lucerne is normally operated by a historic paddle steamer, whilst the train uses air-conditioned coaches with panoramic windows. Premium fares or supplements are charged.

Standard, non-premium, fare alternatives exist for both legs of the journey. The Lake Lucerne Navigation Company provides other services, utilising both paddle steamers and modern motor vessels, between Lucerne and Flüelen. The Swiss South Eastern Railway operates an hourly InterRegio service over the same route as the Panorama Express train between Flüelen and Bellinzona, continuing to Locarno but with connections to Lugano. Direct trains also operate between Lucerne, Bellinzona and Lugano via the far less scenic Gotthard Base Tunnel. This route may be useful for passengers making a return journey, as the journey time by this route is under two hours.

References

External links 
 

Gotthard railway
Lake Lucerne
Named passenger trains of Switzerland
Water transport in Switzerland